Championa westcotti is a species of beetle in the family Cerambycidae. It was described by Noguera and Chemsak in 1997.

References

Heteropsini
Beetles described in 1997